Steve Evans (born 30 October 1962) is a Scottish professional football manager and former player who is the manager of  club Stevenage.

Born in Glasgow, Scotland, Evans played professional football for Bolton Wanderers, Clyde, Albion Rovers, Ayr United, Hamilton Academical and St Johnstone until a knee ligament injury ended his playing career at 24.

After his retirement he became a manager. Prior to taking charge at Crawley Town, he managed Stamford and Boston United, the latter on two occasions.

A controversial figure, whilst manager of Boston United he was successfully prosecuted for tax evasion. However, in charge of Rotherham United, he led the club to two successive promotions. He left the club in late September 2015. On 19 October 2015, Evans replaced Uwe Rösler as head coach of Leeds United, before being sacked in May 2016.

Early life
Born in Glasgow, Scotland, Evans was spotted by scouts from English team Bolton Wanderers when playing for his local youth football club in Glasgow, and he joined Bolton after leaving school.

Playing career
Evans failed to break into the first team at Bolton and was released in 1979. He then returned to his native Scotland and joined Clyde, where he played in 36 league matches, scoring four goals, before joining Albion Rovers in 1981, where he scored 28 goals in 76 league matches during three years at Cliftonhill. He subsequently moved to Ayr United in 1984, scoring four goals in 30 matches, and to Hamilton Academical in 1985, where he only played in two league matches. He joined St Johnstone in 1985 and scored six goals in 24 matches before a knee ligament injury ended his playing career in 1986, aged 24.

Managerial career

Stamford

Evans fell out of football following his retirement, and was working as an account manager for Budweiser when he became manager at Peterborough League side Gedney Hill. He soon moved to Holbeach United for eighteen months, before briefly becoming chairman at Corby Town. His managerial career got going in earnest with Stamford in 1994, who he led to the United Counties Football League Premier Division title and to promotion to the Southern Football League.

Boston United

After resigning as Stamford manager he was appointed manager of Boston United in October 1998. He managed Boston to promotion from the Southern Football League to the Football Conference in 2000 and subsequently to the Football League in 2002. Both promotions have since been overshadowed by revelations of off-the-field cheating.

Evans was suspended by Boston as manager on 4 July 2002 after a much-publicised Football Association (The FA) investigation into "contract irregularities". He later resigned as manager of the club in September 2002, after still being suspended by the club. He was found guilty by The FA in December 2002 of impeding an FA inquiry into contract irregularities. Evans was also suspended from the game for 20 months in January 2003 for involvement of the affairs of Boston, in which players' contracts lodged with the FA contained false salary details. Evans was further accused of impeding the inquiry and fined £8,000. Evans lodged an appeal against charges in May 2003, but The FA rejected his appeal later that month and the punishment stood. Evans later pleaded guilty in court to conspiring to cheat the public revenue, and was given a 12-month prison sentence, suspended for two years.

An announcement was made on 20 February 2004 that Evans would return as Boston's manager on 2 March. In September 2005, Evans and four other people connected with Boston appeared in court, denying fraud charges. In November 2005, Evans was given a £1,000 fine, suspended for a year, after admitting to using insulting or abusive words to the match official in a match against Peterborough United in October 2005. On 11 February 2006, he was escorted from Grimsby Town's stadium Blundell Park by Humberside Police at half-time, after he berated the fourth official after being incensed when Grimsby goalkeeper Steve Mildenhall appeared to handle the ball outside his area and was immediately spoken to by a police officer after a complaint of alleged foul and abusive language. After the match Boston chairman Jon Sotnick accused the football authorities of waging a "conspiracy" against his manager. In October 2006, Evans was linked with the vacant Darlington managerial vacancy, but Boston chairman James Rodwell and Evans both denied the link. Also in October, Evans was sent from the dugout after an altercation with Wycombe Wanderers player Tommy Doherty for which he later received a £1,000 suspended fine from the FA. Despite this, which came on top of his conviction for tax evasion, Evans kept his manager's position at Boston, a decision that angered the Boston United Supporters' Trust.

In March 2007, Evans was left with only 11 professional footballers for the relegation clash with Bury. Although players were back from suspension, Evans was left frustrated after players such as Barnsley's on-loan striker Nathan Joynes quit the club, which left him with just 12 fit senior players and he was forced to put 16- and 17-year-olds on an incomplete substitute's bench. After drawing 1–1 in their penultimate match of the season against relegated Torquay United, Boston needed a win against relegation rivals Wrexham to avoid the drop out of league football.

On 5 May 2007 Boston faced Wrexham in a win or bust situation, and things were looking good for the team when Francis Green opened the scoring for Evans' outfit, who lead 1–0 at half-time, but in the second half United conceded a penalty kick, which Wrexham defender Ryan Valentine converted, and so was the goal that sent Boston down. Two late goals from Chris Llewellyn and Michael Proctor rubber-stamped Wrexham's survival and saw Boston lose 3–1. On 8 May 2007, Evans pledged his commitment to the club despite their relegation and return to non-League football. However, on 27 May, Evans and his assistant manager Paul Raynor resigned from Boston with immediate effect. Evans' two occasions as manager combined at Boston made him the club's second longest serving manager behind Fred Tunstall, who had three occasions as manager of the club in the 1930s, 40s and 50s. He managed the team on 354 occasions, which resulted in 145 wins, 99 draws and 110 losses.

Crawley Town
On 29 May 2007, two days after resigning from the Boston managerial post, Evans took over as Crawley Town manager. He has been sent from the dugout numerous times, which resulted in a ten match ban during the 2008–09 season. He verbally accepted a new three-year contract with Crawley in February 2011.
During the 2010–11 season, Crawley reached the fifth round of the FA Cup, beating Swindon Town of League One, Derby County of the Championship and Torquay United of League Two. In the fifth round they were drawn against Manchester United at Old Trafford. Crawley lost this match 1–0 but earned over £1 million for this match alone. Evans stated afterwards "I think we have done our football club proud and we wanted to go away with some respect" and "We have had a fantastic run in the competition and we could not have wished it to finish anywhere else". On 9 April 2011 Crawley clinched promotion to Football League Two for the 2011–12 season. After August, Evans, along with striker Tyrone Barnett, was nominated for Player of the Month for August and League Two Manager of the Month for August respectively for Crawley Town but lost to Andy Scott for League Two Manager of the Month for August and Mark Arber for Player of the Month for August. Despite this, Evans was named October Manager of the Month due to having five wins, including a 5–2 away victory at AFC Wimbledon, strengthening their push for a second consecutive promotion.

Rotherham United
Evans left Crawley on 9 April 2012 to be appointed manager of fellow League Two club Rotherham United on a three-year contract.
In September 2012, Evans was given a six-match stadium ban and fined £3,000 by the Football Association after being found guilty of "using abusive and insulting words and behaviour" towards a female member of Bradford City's staff, an incident which occurred during his time at Crawley.

In his first full season at the club, Rotherham showed inconsistent form throughout, but a run of 5 wins in their last 5 games saw them elevate into the automatic promotion places, finishing second behind champions Gillingham, after a 2 – 0 win over Aldershot Town saw Rotherham promoted on the final day.
Starting the following season in League One, Evans continued to produce good results, an honorable mention being the 6–0 win at home against Notts County. Rotherham were promoted later that season in May 2014, drawing the play-off final 2–2 over 120 minutes, and subsequently beating Leyton Orient 4 – 3 in a penalty shootout.

On 29 May 2014, Evans agreed a new three-year contract with Rotherham, live on Sky Sports News, a deal which would commit him to the club until 2017. 
Under his management Rotherham survived their first season back in the Championship, with a game to spare. Evans wore a sombrero, shorts and sandals to the fixture against Leeds United at Elland Road on the final day of the season by way of a celebration.

On 28 September 2015, Evans and his assistant manager Paul Raynor left Rotherham with the club citing that the two parties wanted to take the club in different directions. He was replaced as manager on 9 October by former Leeds Head Coach Neil Redfearn.

Leeds United
On 19 October 2015, Evans joined fellow Championship side Leeds United on a rolling contract until the end of the 2015–16 season, with the option of a second year, replacing previous Head Coach Uwe Rösler. Evans' assistant at Rotherham, Paul Raynor, also joined him as part of the coaching staff.

Evans took charge of a Leeds side one point off the relegation zone, however, he managed to guide Leeds to a 13th-place finish at the end of the 2015–16 season with Leeds finishing 15 points behind the playoff positions. He also gave débuts to 3 academy graduates during the season with Lewie Coyle, Bailey Peacock-Farrell and Ronaldo Vieira all making their débuts under Evans during his tenure. Evans also helped Leeds have an FA Cup run, however his side were knocked out on 20 February 2016 against Premier League side Watford in a narrow 1–0 defeat after a high-profile own goal from Leeds defender Scott Wootton to send Watford through to the FA Cup quarter-final.

After the final game of the 2015–16 season against Preston North End, a tearful Evans proclaimed that he had a 'gut feeling' that his contract would not be renewed by club owner Massimo Cellino.

On 23 May 2016, it was revealed that MK Dons Manager Karl Robinson had turned down the opportunity from Cellino to become Leeds United Head Coach, further casting doubt on Evans's future at the club. On 27 May, after being turned down by Robinson, Cellino then approached Bristol Rovers manager Darrell Clarke to replace Evans, however again was rebuffed with Clarke preferring to sign a new contract with Rovers. On 27 May, Evans revealed that despite Cellino publicly approaching other managers to replace him he would still say 'yes' if Cellino was to ask him to stay on as Leeds Head Coach, however he also revealed that he would need to be given an answer regarding his future – "I need to establish, in the next week or so at the latest, whether I have a plan going forward at Leeds United."

On 31 May 2016 Evans, along with his assistant Paul Raynor, was sacked by Cellino, becoming the sixth manager sacked by Cellino in two years. On Evans's sacking Cellino revealed in a club statement that he felt the club 'needed a different approach in order to achieve targets for the new season'.

On 14 June, after being linked with the managerial vacancy at Bradford City, Evans revealed to Telegraph & Argus he had held talks with a club in China to manage a club in China League One, Evans described the financial package as 'mind-blowing' but rejected the job due to personal reasons to stay with his family in England. On 21 June Evans was offered the managerial job at League One side Oldham Athletic but after originally agreeing personal terms he decided to pursue other managerial offers in the pipeline.

Mansfield Town
Evans was appointed manager of League Two side Mansfield Town on 16 November 2016, replacing Adam Murray. He resigned on 27 February 2018, saying he wanted to go and work in China.

Peterborough United
Evans was appointed manager of League One side Peterborough United on 28 February 2018, one day after leaving Mansfield. On 23 January 2019 he was charged by the FA over comments made to a match official during a defeat against Luton Town, and then on the 26th both he and assistant Paul Raynor were released from their contracts, with Darren Ferguson taking charge just hours later.

Gillingham
On 21 May 2019, Evans was announced as the new manager of Gillingham and began his role on 1 June 2019. Evans was awarded the League One Manager of the Month award for March 2021 after achieving 17 points from a possible 24.

In August 2021, Evans started the 2020-21 season by being awarded a yellow card in the first match against Lincoln City, and then a red card in the next game, a EFL Cup fixture against Crawley Town. He was then once again charged with verbally abusing a match official.

On 9 January 2022, following a 4–0 home defeat to Ipswich Town that left the side 22nd in the table, seven points from safety, Evans was sacked by the club.

Stevenage
Evans was appointed as manager of League Two club Stevenage on 16 March 2022, the club sitting in 22nd position just three points clear of the relegation zone with the team below having two games in hand. Survival was secured with three matches remaining after a run of ten points across Evans' first six matches, culminating in a 2–0 home win over Tranmere Rovers, saw his side move seven points clear of Oldham Athletic who were relegated at Stevenage's expense. Evans' 2022–23 campaign started strongly with 10 victories out of 13 in the League, resulting in Stevenage sitting top of the league on 8 October 2022. In an FA Cup third-round tie at Premier League side Aston Villa, Evans' side came from behind to win 2–1 at Villa Park.

Personal life
As of 2004, Evans was married to Sarah-Jane and had two daughters. He is a supporter of Scottish club Celtic.

Managerial statistics

Honours

As a manager 
Stamford
United Counties League Premier Division: 1996–97, 1997–98

Boston United
Southern Football League Premier Division: 1999–2000
Football Conference: 2001–02

Crawley Town
Conference Premier: 2010–11

Rotherham United
Football League Two runner-up: 2012–13
Football League One play-offs: 2014

Individual
Football League Two Manager of the Month: October 2011
EFL League One Manager of the Month: August 2018, March 2021

References

External links

1962 births
Living people
Footballers from Glasgow
Scottish footballers
Association football forwards
Bolton Wanderers F.C. players
Clyde F.C. players
Albion Rovers F.C. players
Ayr United F.C. players
Hamilton Academical F.C. players
St Johnstone F.C. players
Scottish Football League players
Scottish football managers
Stamford A.F.C. managers
Boston United F.C. managers
Crawley Town F.C. managers
Rotherham United F.C. managers
Leeds United F.C. managers
Mansfield Town F.C. managers
Peterborough United F.C. managers
Gillingham F.C. managers
Stevenage F.C. managers
English Football League managers
National League (English football) managers
Southern Football League managers
British people convicted of tax crimes
British football chairmen and investors